Grand Duchess Natalia Petrovna of Russia (20 August 1718 – 15 March 1725) was the youngest daughter of Peter the Great and his second wife, Catherine I.

Life
Natalia was born in St. Petersburg, on 20 August 1718, during the peace negotiations with Sweden (Aland Congress). When Peter was at this time on the teachings of the galley fleet, and to learn about the birth of his daughter, made a feast, and sent his fleet to St. Petersburg.

Only Anna, Elizabeth and Natalia were alive at the proclamation of the Russian Empire in 1721 and received the title tsesarevna.
When Natalia Petrovna died in St. Petersburg of measles though more than a month after her father, on 4 March 1725, Peter was not yet buried, and the coffin of the young grand duchess was placed in the same room. She was buried alongside other young children in the Peter and Paul Cathedral in St. Petersburg.

1718 births
1725 deaths
House of Romanov
Russian grand duchesses
Deaths from measles
18th-century people from the Russian Empire
Daughters of Russian emperors
Royalty and nobility who died as children